Nigel Leigh Cox (born 1945 in Surrey) is an English consultant rheumatologist and one of the few doctors in Britain to have been charged with attempted murder. In 1992 he was convicted of the attempted murder of patient Lillian Boyes, and received a suspended sentence.

Career
Cox worked at the Royal Hampshire County Hospital, Winchester, England.

Lillian Boyes
In 1991 Lillian Boyes, then 70, entered the Royal Hampshire County Hospital. Cox was her consultant and had been treating Boyes for 13 years. As her rheumatoid arthritis became worse, she pleaded with him to end her life. According to the hospital chaplain, 'When anyone touched her you could hear the bones move about in their joints. The sound will stay with me to the grave'.

In August 1991, Cox administered an injection of two ampoules of potassium chloride, in order to stop her heart. After she died, Patrick, one of her sons, thanked Cox. In Cox's view, he probably shortened her life by "between 15 minutes and an hour."

Cox entered the amount used in the hospital log - twice the amount needed to cause death. It was then noticed by a nurse, who reported it. Cox signed the cause of death as having been bronchial pneumonia.

Cox was arrested for attempted murder and suspended for 18 months by the hospital, though he was allowed to teach at another hospital and continue his private practice.

Trial
Cox was tried at Winchester Crown Court in September 1992 by Mr Justice Ognall. Cox was charged with attempted murder, since it was impossible to conclusively prove that the injection he gave killed her. He was given a 12-month suspended sentence. Boyes' family supported his actions throughout the trial.

Post-trial career
In November 1992, the professional conduct committee of the General Medical Council decided to take no further action. Cox returned to his former job in February 1993, under supervision.

See also
John Bodkin Adams - British suspected serial killer acquitted in 1957 of murdering an elderly patient.
Leonard Arthur - British doctor acquitted in 1981 of murdering a Down's Syndrome baby
Howard Martin - British doctor who admitted hastening the deaths of two patients
David Moor - British doctor acquitted in 1999 of murdering a terminally ill patient. Moor admitted in a press interview to having killed 300 patients over 30 years

References

External links
2005 Independent on Sunday interview with Cox
Article on euthanasia, including a detailed discussion of Cox's case on page 6

1945 births
Living people
20th-century English medical doctors
English criminals
Euthanasia activists
Euthanasia doctors